Rhinestone Cowboy (New Studio Recordings) contains nine songs that were previously unreleased: "All the Way", "Blue Sky Shining", "By the Time I Get to Phoenix", "Didn't We", "Learning the Blues", "Pretend", "Rhinestone Cowboy", "Young at Heart" and "Colleen". The origins of these recordings are unknown. The others songs on this compilation were taken from the Love Songs disc of the 1999 release My Hits and Love Songs.

Track listing
 "Rhinestone Cowboy" (Larry Weiss) – 2:59
 "By the Time I Get to Phoenix" (Jimmy Webb) – 2:45
 "You'll Never Walk Alone" (Oscar Hammerstein II, Richard Rodgers) – 2:45
 "Bridge Over Troubled Water" (Paul Simon) – 4:38
 "Feelings" (Albert, Kaiserman, Gate) – 3:42
 "You Don't Have to Say You Love Me" (Vicki Wickham, Simon Napier-Bell, Pino Donaggio, Vito Pallavicini) – 2:37
 "All the Way" (Sammy Cahn, Jimmy Van Heusen) – 3:18
 "Blue Sky Shining" (Mickey Newbury) – 2:36
 "Colleen" (Michael Smotherman) – 3:56
 "Didn't We" (Jimmy Webb)
 "Learning the Blues" (Silvers) – 3:11
 "Pretend" (Douglas) – 2:55
 "The Impossible Dream" (Joe Darion, Mitch Leigh) – 2:39
 "Without You" (Loewe, Lerner) – 3:06
 "Young at Heart" (Leigh, Richards) – 2:54

2004 compilation albums
Glen Campbell compilation albums